Tamás Lapsánszki (born 9 November 1974) is a Hungarian footballer who plays for Békéscsabai Előre FC as midfielder.

External links
Career statistics

1974 births
Living people
Hungarian footballers
Association football defenders
Békéscsaba 1912 Előre footballers
People from Kecskemét
Sportspeople from Bács-Kiskun County